Jardim Botânico, Portuguese for botanical garden, may refer to:

Botanical gardens
Jardim Botânico do Rio de Janeiro, the Portuguese name for the Rio de Janeiro Botanical Garden in Rio de Janeiro, Brazil
Jardim Botânico da Universidade de Coimbra, the Portuguese name for the Botanical Garden of the University of Coimbra in Coimbra, Portugal
Jardim Botânico do Funchal, a botanical garden in Funchal, Madeira, Portugal
Jardim Botânico de Lisboa, a botanical garden in Lisbon, Portugal
Jardim Botânico (Cape Verde), a botanical garden in São Jorge dos Órgãos, Cape Verde
Jardim Botânico de Curitiba, the Portuguese name for the Botanical Garden of Curitiba in Curitiba, Brazil
Jardim Botânico do Porto, a botanical garden in Porto, Portugal
Jardim Botânico do Faial, the Portuguese name for the Botanical Garden of Faial on Faial, Portugal

Places
Jardim Botânico, Federal District
Jardim Botânico, Rio de Janeiro, a residential neighborhood in Rio de Janeiro, Brazil
Jardim Botânico, Rio Grande do Sul, a residential neighborhood in Porto Alegre, Brazil

See also
Botanical garden